Megachile niveofasciata is a species of bee in the family Megachilidae. It was described by Friese in 1904.

References

Niveofasciata
Insects described in 1904